Princess Yeongon (Hangul: 영온 옹주; Hanja: 永溫 翁主; 1817 – 1829) was the daughter of King Sunjo of Joseon and Royal Consort Sug-ui of the Miryang Park clan.

Biography
Princess Yeongon was born on May 11, 1817, as the only child of King Sunjo by his concubine, Royal Consort Sug-ui of the Miryang Park clan. She was the younger half-sister of Crown Prince Hyomyeong.

In 1827 (2nd year of her father's reign), she was granted the title of Princess Yeongon (영온 옹주).

She was said to had been frequently ill as a child and spoke with difficulty.

Princess Yeongon died in 1829. Crown Prince Hyomyeong, who would visit and take care of his sister whenever she fell ill, died a year after her, on June 25, 1830. Many believe that he died from a broken heart.

The Princess's tomb was originally was located at Hyochang-dong, Yongsan District, Seoul, but was relocated during the Japanese Colonial period to Seosamneung, in Goyang, along with her birth mother, Lady Park.

Family 
 Father: Yi Gong, King Sunjo (조선 순조) (29 August 1790 – 13 December 1834)
 Grandfather: Yi San, King Jeongjo (조선 정조) (28 October 1752 – 18 August 1800)
 Grandmother: Royal Noble Consort Su of the Bannam Park clan (수빈 반남 박씨) (1 June 1770 – 6 February 1823)
 Mother: Royal Consort Sug-ui of the Miryang Park clan (숙의 밀양 박씨) (? – 1854)

In popular culture
 Portrayed by Heo Jung-eun in the 2016 KBS2 TV series Love in the Moonlight.

References

19th-century Korean people
19th-century Korean women
1817 births
1829 deaths
Princesses of Joseon
Royalty and nobility who died as children